Enough of You may refer to:

"Enough of You", a song by Nikki Yanofsky on her 2014 album Little Secret
"Enough of You", a song by Toro y Moi on his 2015 album Samantha